The Standard Bearer is a three-quarter-length self-portrait by Rembrandt formerly in the Paris collection of Elie de Rothschild, and purchased by the Rijksmuseum for 175 million euros with assistance from the Dutch state and Vereniging Rembrandt in 2021.  It was painted on the occasion of the artist's move from Leiden to Amsterdam and is seen as an important early work that "shows Rembrandt's ambition to paint a group portrait for the Amsterdam militia, at the time the most valued commission a painter could be awarded."

Rembrandt's flag bearer has several copies in oil, and later prints may be from such copies, but this painting nevertheless has a provenance reaching far into the 18th-century. It was documented as a self-portrait by Smith in 1836, who wrote: 

Cornelis Hofstede de Groot agreed with him in 1914, but stopped short of calling it a self-portrait. He wrote:

2022 acquisition by the Netherlands
In 2019 the painting has been classified as a national treasure of France, so an export bar was in place for 30 months, while the Louvre tried to raise funds to buy the painting. The museum was unable to do so and waived its right of first refusal for purchase. In December 2021, the Dutch state announced its intention to buy the work for the national collection.

As result, the Rothschild family sold the painting to the Netherlands for €175 million in 2022. The Dutch government paid €150 million, while the Rembrandt Association and the Rijksmuseum contributed a total of €25 million. It was bought from the Rothschild family, who had owned it since 1844, via a trust located in the tax haven of the Cook Islands. The Standard Bearer is to tour every province in the Netherlands before going on display at the Rijksmuseum's Gallery of Honour. It was acquired during the COVID-19 pandemic amid media coverage of failing income for the Netherlands' cultural sector. The painting was shown at the Rijksmuseum in 2019 and had attracted the museum's interest since France agreed to let the painting leave the country.

The painting wil tour to Fries Museum in Leeuwarden (May 2022), Centraal Museum in Utrecht (June 2022), Stedelijk Museum Alkmaar (July 2022), Drents Museum in Assen (August 2022),  in Almere (September 2022), Het Noordbrabants Museum in Den Bosch (October 2022), Mauritshuis in The Hague (November 2022), Rijksmuseum Twenthe in Enschede (December 2022), Museum Arnhem in Arnhem (January 2023),  in Middelburg (February 2023), Bonnefantenmuseum in Maastricht (March 2023) and Groninger Museum in Groningen (April 2023).

Notable copies

See also
 List of most expensive paintings
 List of paintings by Rembrandt

References

Standard
2021 in the Netherlands
1636 paintings
Paintings in the collection of the Rijksmuseum